The Duckworth Grimshaw House, at 95 N. 400 West in Beaver, Utah, was built in 1877.  It was listed on the National Register of Historic Places in 1980.

It is a one-and-a-half-story I-house built of black rock (basalt).

It was a work of stonemason Thomas Frazer.

References

		
National Register of Historic Places in Beaver County, Utah
Houses completed in 1877
1877 establishments in Utah Territory